Tauber is a river in Germany. It is also the surname of:
 Alfred Tauber (1866–1942), Austrian mathematician 
 Alfred I. Tauber (born 1947), American philosopher and historian
 Bernd Tauber (born 1950), German actor
 Henryk Tauber (1917-2000), Polish Jewish Holocaust survivor
 Maria Anna Tauber, Austrian soprano
 Mathias Tauber (born 1984), Danish footballer
 Maurice Tauber (1908-1980), American librarian
 Nick Tauber, British record producer
 Nicolás Tauber (born 1980), Argentine-Israeli footballer
 Olga Von Tauber (1907-2002), Austrian-American psychiatrist
 Peter Tauber (born 1974), German politician
 Richard Tauber (1891–1948), Viennese tenor (born Ernst Seiffert)
 Sophie Tauber (1889–1943), Swiss artist
 Ulrike Tauber (born 1958), German swimmer
 William C. Tauber, American entrepreneur
 Yanki Tauber (born 1965), Jewish writer

See also 
 Irene Barnes Taeuber (1906–1974), American demographer
 Teyber (musician family sometimes spelled this way)
 Taube (disambiguation), includes "Taub"
 Taubes
 Taubmann
 Dauber (disambiguation)
 Daub (disambiguation)

German-language surnames
Occupational surnames